Torbjörn Persson (born 14 January 1960) is a former Swedish footballer and coach.

Career
Persson played 574 matches for Malmö FF. He became Swedish champion two times and capped 8 times for the national team. Persson holds the record for most Allsvenskan wins for Malmö FF having been at the club when they won Allsvenskan five times in a row between 1985–1989. However, as Allsvenskan had championship playoffs at the time and Mamö FF managed to win two of them Persson only won two Swedish championships although having won the league five times.

After his player career he briefly started a coach career, now he is an IT specialist working at Alfa Laval Lund AB.

References

1960 births
Swedish footballers
Sweden international footballers
Footballers from Skåne County
Malmö FF players
Allsvenskan players
Living people
Högaborgs BK players
Association football defenders